Lokmanya Tilak Terminus- Gorakhpur Weekly Express is an intercity train of the Indian Railways connecting Lokmanya Tilak Terminus in Maharashtra and Gorakhpur Junction of Uttar Pradesh. It is currently being operated with 15603/15604 train numbers on daily basis.

It was introduced in 2014's Railway Budget and began operation in February 2015. LTT Express consists of 22 coaches which includes one AC-II coach, three AC-III coaches, thirteen sleeper class coaches, three general (unreserved) coaches and two SLR overall 22 coaches.

Express trains in India
Railway services introduced in 2015
Transport in Mumbai
Rail transport in Maharashtra
Rail transport in Madhya Pradesh
Passenger trains originating from Gorakhpur